PE2 may refer to:

 Meridian LRT station, Singapore
 Parasite Eve II, an action role-playing survival horror video game
 Personal Editor 2, a text editor for MS-DOS
 Petty Enterprises, NASCAR race team
 Petlyakov Pe-2, Soviet combat aircraft from WW2
 Plastic Explosive No 2